"Any Way the Wind Blows" is a song written by John McFee and Andre Pessis, and recorded by American country music group Southern Pacific. It was released in June 1989 as the first single from the album County Line.  The song reached No. 4 on the Billboard Hot Country Singles & Tracks chart. It was featured in the 1989 movie Pink Cadillac.

Personnel
Keith Knudsen – drums, background vocals
John McFee – lead vocals, lead guitar
Stu Cook – bass guitar, background vocals
Kurt Howell – synthesizer, lead vocals, background vocals

Chart performance

Year-end charts

References

1989 singles
Southern Pacific (band) songs
Song recordings produced by Jim Ed Norman
Songs written by John McFee
Warner Records singles
1989 songs
Songs written by Andre Pessis